Laïd Madouni, sometimes spelt as El Aïd Madouni, (born June 23, 1986) is an Algerian football player who plays for ES Mostaganem in the Algerian Ligue Professionnelle 2.

Club career
In the summer of 2009, Madouni was close to joining MO Constantine. However, the club was not willing to pay the high transfer fee set by the team president.

In May 2010, Madouni was linked with a move to WA Tlemcen, after scoring 13 goals in the 2009–10 season for ES Mostaganem. He was also linked to a number of other first division clubs including MC Oran, USM Blida and CA Bordj Bou Arréridj. However, on July 12, Madouni signed a contract with MC Saïda, joining them on a free transfer.

References

External links
 DZFoot Profile
 

1986 births
Living people
Algerian footballers
Algerian Ligue Professionnelle 1 players
MC Saïda players
ES Mostaganem players
ES Sétif players
Association football forwards
21st-century Algerian people